Grey Mare's Tail or Greymare's Tail is the name of several waterfalls:

Scotland
Grey Mare's Tail, Galloway
Grey Mare's Tail, Kilpatrick Hills
Grey Mare's Tail, Kinlochmore
Greymare's Tail, Kirkconnel
Grey Mare's Tail, Moffat Hills
Grey Mare's Tail, Monreith

Wales
Grey Mare's Tail, Conwy

See also
 Marestail (disambiguation)